Mohammad Amir Khan (Urdu, ; born 6 September 2001) is a Pakistani cricketer. He has played for Pakistan national under-19 cricket team and represents Khyber Pakhtunkhwa in domestic cricket.

In December 2019, he was drafted by the Pakistan Super League (PSL) franchise Peshawar Zalmi in Emerging category during the 2020 PSL draft. He made his Twenty20 debut on 22 February 2020, for Peshawar Zalmi in the 2020 Pakistan Super League. He made his List A debut on 22 January 2021, for Khyber Pakhtunkhwa, in the 2020–21 Pakistan Cup. He made his first-class debut on 20 October 2021, for Khyber Pakhtunkhwa in the 2021–22 Quaid-e-Azam Trophy.

References

External links
 
 Profile on PCB's website

2001 births
Living people
Pakistani cricketers
Khyber Pakhtunkhwa cricketers
Peshawar Zalmi cricketers